The 2019 WNBA season was the 23rd season for the Los Angeles Sparks of the Women's National Basketball Association. 

During the off-season, head coach Brian Agler resigned and accepted the head coach position with the Dallas Wings. On December 5, former NBA player Derek Fisher was announced as the new head coach.

The Sparks started the season with a 6-6 record in the first two months. Their good form continued into August, with the team going 8–4 and putting together a five game win streak.  The turn around game mostly at home, with the Sparks posting a 9–0 home record during July and August.  The team finished out the season with three straight wins at home.  Their 22–12 overall record, secured them the third seed in the playoffs.

After earning a bye in the first round, the Sparks easily defeated the Seattle Storm at home, 92–69.  This set up a semifinal matchup with the Connecticut Sun.  The Sparks lost the first two road games in the series, and couldn't win the third game at home.  The Sun swept the Sparks to end their season.

After the 2019 season, Penny Toler was dismissed as general manager.  Her dismissal came among rumors that she entered the locker room after a playoff game and gave a "obscenity-laced speech that also included several racial epithets".

Transactions

WNBA Draft

Trades/Roster Changes

Roster

Game log

Preseason

|- style="background:#fcc;"
| 1
| May 11
| @ Phoenix Mercury
| L 75–82
| Walker (16)
| Tied (7)
| Jones (5)
| Talking Stick Resort Arena3,751
| 0–1
|- style="background:#bbffbb;"
| 2
| May 17
| Seattle Storm
| W 92–85
| N. Ogwumike (18)
| N. Ogwumike (7)
| Jones (6)
| Hutto-Patterson GymN/A
| 1–1

Regular season 

|- style="background:#fcc;"
| 1
| May 26
| @ Las Vegas Aces
| L 70–83
| Vadeeva (24)
| N. Ogwumike (11)
| 3 tied (4)
| Mandalay Bay Events Center7,249
| 0–1
|- style="background:#bbffbb;"
| 2
| May 31
| Connecticut Sun
| W 77–70
| C. Ogwumike (20)
| N. Ogwumike (15)
| Tied (4)
| Staples Center12,334
| 1–1

|- style="background:#bbffbb;"
| 3
| June 4
| @ New York Liberty
| W 78–73
| Gray (29)
| C. Ogwumike (10)
| Gray (4)
| Westchester County Center3,579
| 2–1
|- style="background:#fcc;"
| 4
| June 6
| @ Connecticut Sun
| L 77–89
| N. Ogwumike (21)
| N. Ogwumike (10)
| Gray (6)
| Mohegan Sun Arena5,496
| 2–2
|- style="background:#bbffbb;"
| 5
| June 8
| @ Minnesota Lynx
| W 89–85
| Williams (25)
| Tied (9)
| Ruffin-Pratt (5)
| Target Center8,834
| 3–2
|- style="background:#bbffbb;"
| 6
| June 14
| @ Phoenix Mercury
| W 85–65
| Gray (21)
| N. Ogwumike (8)
| Gray (9)
| Talking Stick Resort Arena10,381
| 4–2
|- style="background:#fcc;"
| 7
| June 15
| New York Liberty
| L 92–98
| C. Ogwumike (26)
| C. Ogwumike (14)
| Gray (6)
| Staples Center11,388
| 4–3
|- style="background:#fcc;"
| 8
| June 18
| Washington Mystics
| L 52–81
| Tied (12)
| Tied (7)
| Parker (3)
| Staples Center9,537
| 4–4
|- style="background:#fcc;"
| 9
| June 21
| @ Seattle Storm
| L 62–84
| N. Ogwumike (10)
| C. Ogwumike (6)
| 4 tied (2)
| Angel of the Winds Arena6,114
| 4–5
|- style="background:#fcc;"
| 10
| June 23
| @ Phoenix Mercury
| L 72–82
| Tied (12)
| N. Ogwumike (13)
| Gray (7)
| Talking Stick Resort Arena10,132
| 4–6
|- style="background:#bbffbb;"
| 11
| June 27
| Las Vegas Aces
| W 86–74
| 3 tied (18)
| C. Ogwumike (10)
| Gray (6)
| Staples Center10,295
| 5–6
|- style="background:#bbffbb;"
| 12
| June 30
| Chicago Sky
| W 94–69
| Williams (19)
| C. Ogwumike (7)
| Tied (5)
| Staples Center11,067
| 6–6

|- style="background:#bbffbb;"
| 13
| July 7
| Washington Mystics
| W 98–81
| N. Ogwumike (31)
| Tied (10)
| Gray (13)
| Staples Center10,336
| 7–6
|- style="background:#fcc;"
| 14
| July 9
| @ Dallas Wings
| L 62–74
| N. Ogwumike (15)
| Tied (10)
| Gray (4)
| College Park Center6,885
| 7–7
|- style="background:#bbffbb;"
| 15
| July 12
| @ Indiana Fever
| W 90–84
| N. Ogwumike (22)
| C. Ogwumike (9)
| Gray (6)
| Bankers Life Fieldhouse7,849
| 8–7
|- style="background:#bbffbb;"
| 16
| July 14
| @ Atlanta Dream
| W 76–71 (OT)
| Williams (23)
| N. Ogwumike (15)
| Gray (9)
| State Farm Arena5,083
| 9–7
|- style="background:#bbffbb;"
| 17
| July 18
| Dallas Wings
| W 69–64
| N. Ogwumike (22)
| Gray (9)
| Gray (4)
| Staples Center14,050
| 10–7
|- style="background:#fcc;"
| 18
| July 20
| @ New York Liberty
| L 78–83
| N. Ogwumike (20)
| N. Ogwumike (12)
| Wiese (6)
| Westchester County Center2,195
| 10–8
|- style="background:#bbffbb;"
| 19
| July 23
| @ Atlanta Dream
| W 78–66
| N. Ogwumike (24)
| C. Ogwumike (12)
| Gray (6)
| State Farm Arena7,047
| 11–8

|- style="background:#bbffbb;"
| 20
| August 1
| Las Vegas Aces
| W 76–68
| N. Ogwumike (19)
| N. Ogwumike (11)
| Gray (10)
| Staples Center11,692
| 12–8
|- style="background:#bbffbb;"
| 21
| August 4
| Seattle Storm
| W 83–75
| Parker (21)
| N. Ogwumike (10)
| Gray (8)
| Staples Center12,820
| 13–8
|- style="background:#bbffbb;"
| 22
| August 8
| Phoenix Mercury
| W 84–74
| N. Ogwumike (24)
| Parker (11)
| Parker (6)
| Staples Center10,345
| 14–8
|- style="background:#bbffbb;"
| 23
| August 11
| Chicago Sky
| W 84–81
| Gray (26)
| N. Ogwumike (12)
| Gray (6)
| Staples Center9,244
| 15–8
|- style="background:#fcc;"
| 24
| August 14
| @ Dallas Wings
| L 78–84
| Gray (22)
| N. Ogwumike (9)
| Gray (7)
| College Park Center5,004
| 15–9
|- style="background:#fcc;"
| 25
| August 16
| @ Chicago Sky
| L 81–91
| Gray (25)
| N. Ogwumike (7)
| Tied (5)
| Wintrust Arena7,907
| 15–10
|- style="background:#bbffbb;"
| 26
| August 20
| Minnesota Lynx
| W 81–71
| Parker (20)
| Parker (10)
| N. Ogwumike (4)
| Staples Center
| 16–10
|- style="background:#bbffbb;"
| 27
| August 22
| Indiana Fever
| W 98–65
| N. Ogwumike (17)
| Tied (7)
| Parker (5)
| Staples Center8,816
| 17–10
|- style="background:#bbffbb;"
| 28
| August 25
| Connecticut Sun
| W 84–72
| Williams (21)
| N. Ogwumike (8)
| Gray (6)
| Staples Center17,076
| 18–10
|- style="background:#fcc;"
| 29
| August 27
| @ Washington Mystics
| L 66–95
| Tied (12)
| Vadeeva (7)
| Gray (7)
| St. Elizabeth's East Arena4,200
| 18–11
|- style="background:#bbffbb;"
| 30
| August 29
| @ Indiana Fever
| W 87–83
| Gray (30)
| N. Ogwumike (8)
| Gray (9)
| Bankers Life Fieldhouse5,641
| 19–11
|- style="background:#fcc;"
| 31
| August 31
| @ Las Vegas Aces
| L 86–92
| Williams (37)
| N. Ogwumike (7)
| Gray (7)
| Mandalay Bay Events Center8,470
| 19–12

|- style="background:#bbffbb;"
| 32
| September 3
| Atlanta Dream
| W 70–60
| Parker (21)
| Parker (11)
| Parker (6)
| Staples Center9,889
| 20–12
|- style="background:#bbffbb;"
| 33
| September 5
| Seattle Storm
| W 102–68
| Parker (20)
| N. Ogwumike (10)
| Gray (7)
| Staples Center10,591
| 21–12
|- style="background:#bbffbb;"
| 34
| September 8
| Minnesota Lynx
| W 77–68
| Williams (15)
| Parker (7)
| Gray (8)
| Staples Center13,500
| 22–12

Playoffs

|- style="background:#bbffbb;"
| 1
| September 15
| Seattle Storm
| W 92–68
| Gray (21)
| Parker (10)
| Gray (8)
| Staples Center9,081
| 1–0

|- style="background:#fcc;"
| 1
| September 17
| @ Connecticut Sun
| L 75–84
| Parker (24)
| Tied (10)
| Gray (4)
| Mohegan Sun Arena7,102
| 0–1
|- style="background:#fcc;"
| 2
| September 19
| @ Connecticut Sun
| L 68–94
| N. Ogwumike (18)
| N. Ogwumike (7)
| Gray (5)
| Mohegan Sun Arena8,051
| 0–2
|- style="background:#fcc;"
| 3
| September 22
| Connecticut Sun
| L 56–78
| N. Ogwumike (17)
| N. Ogwumike (6)
| Gray (4)
| Walter Pyramid4,000
| 0–3

Standings

Playoffs

Statistics

Regular season

Awards and honors

References

External links

Los Angeles Sparks seasons
Los Angeles
Los Angeles Sparks